William Church may refer to:

William Church (inventor) (1778–1863), American inventor who patented a typesetting machine in 1822
William Campbell Church (died 1915), Scottish rugby union player
William Conant Church (1836–1917), American journalist and soldier
William W. Church (1874–?), American football coach
Sir William Church, 1st Baronet (1837–1928), English physician
William S. Church (1858–?), American politician from New York

See also
Church (surname)